Patara Elephant Farm is an elephant breeding farm located near Chiang Mai in Thailand.

Background

Patara Elephant Farm is a health-recovery and reproduction-management farm for elephants. Its main focus is on educating the public on elephants and the threats they face. To do this, the farm pairs visitors up with an elephant for a day and assigns them the task of caring for that elephant. As of December 2014, the farm is home to 55 elephants. It is located in the mountains near Hang Dong Valley, 45 minutes south of Chiang Mai, Thailand. It was founded in 2001 by a man named Theerapat "Pat" Trungprakan's and his wife Anocha "Dao" with the goal of preserving the elephant population in Thailand. Theerapat says there is much sacrifice involved and says he and the other caretakers spend more time with the elephants than with their wives. The elephant's caretakers, known as mahouts, are from a nearby Karen village and are paired-up with their own elephant to take care of.

Mission statement and the four points of emphasis

Patara's conservation philosophy is "Extinction is Forever" which is why their solution is elephant conservation through breeding. In order to preserve the Thai elephant population, the farm has four points of emphasis that they center their work around. These points are: rescue, recovery, reproduction, and reintroduction. Rescuing means taking elephants that have nowhere else to go. Theerapat says part of Patara's mission is to "adopt elephants people don't want anymore – healthy ones with the potential to live 80 years and produce a baby." One example is Noi/Nui, who was rescued from a circus. Patara also adopts elephants from the streets of Bangkok, who are used by their mahouts to get money from the tourism industry,and Some of their elephants also used to work in the illegal logging industry. Therefore, the rescued elephants recovery process is the farm's first priority. For reproduction, Patara focuses on actual mating instead of artificial insemination. This is because Theerapat believes it is more successful. In terms of reintroduction, Patara releases its elephants into the wild whenever possible. However, Theerapat believes simply releasing them is not the answer since, in his words, "you can't just suddenly put domestic elephants into the wild. Their survival rates are too low." Therefore, the farm's belief is that through education and one-on-one interactions with elephants, people will understand elephants and what is needed for their welfare. This is why Patara encourages visitors to come and learn about elephants by caring for them. In terms of reproductive success, so far they have breed 24 elephants in 10 years. Every year, around 2–3 baby elephants are born. Five baby elephants were born in 2013. The first baby who was born at the farm is a male elephant named Puchan.

Program

A trip to Patara consists of a hands-on-experience where each visitor is given an elephant to take care of for a half-day or a full day. This program is called “Elephant Owner for a Day,” and its goal is for visitors to better understand elephant health and behavior by caring for an elephant. These activities include feeding the elephant, checking its health, bathing it, learning how to communicate with it, and ride it. All visitors, including children and people with disabilities, are welcomed. Through these interactions, Patara hopes that visitors will develop a trusting relationship with their elephant. The program costs around $200 per person, and the groups are small, with a maximum of twelve visitors per day The program cost is needed since Patara does not receive any of its funding from the Thai government.

Arrival

When visitors first arrive at the farm, they are given shirts and pants traditionally worn by mahouts. Visitors are from all over the world, including the United States, Canada, Austria, France, Germany, Puerto Rico, and Singapore. Then, they are asked to sit down and Theerapat gives a talk on the history of domesticating elephants in Thailand, the state of elephants in Thailand today, and why the farm was founded. After the talk, visitors are led to an open area where the elephants are and visitors are then called over by Theerapat to be paired-up with an elephant. Visitors are paired with elephants based on their personality in order to promote a good relationship between visitors and the elephants they are paired with. Visitors are also helped by the elephant's mahout who makes sure they properly care for and interact with their elephant. Furthermore, when baby elephants are at the farm, visitors are also allowed to interact with them while the babies mothers are nearby.

Education on elephant behavior

Visitors are also taught to read their elephant's behavior. They are told that elephants who are calm and happy wag their tails and wave their ears back and forth. When talking to an elephant, visitors are told that if the elephant responds, it is a good sign. To communicate with their elephant, visitors are taught the Thai words boun, which means "open your mouth," and didi, which means "good." Visitors learn these words when they are feeding their elephant right after they have been introduced. When first meeting their elephant, visitors are given a basket of food consisting of sugar cane, tamarind, and bananas to give to their elephant in order to make friends with them. Visitors are also taught that elephants express affection by putting their trunk around them. These are referred to as elephant "kisses."

Education on elephant health

Before checking the health of their elephant, visitors are given a demonstration on how to check an elephant's health. Checking their elephant's health includes checking for teeth health, intestinal health, and sweat gland health, and checking for sleeping problems. In order to check for intestinal and teeth health, visitors check their elephant's excrement. To check for intestinal problems, they are first told to count their elephant's number of droppings. If there are around six pieces per bathroom time, then the elephant is considered healthy because it has been eating enough. Elephants can eat around 300 pounds of food per day. Furthermore, visitors are asked to smell the elephant dung and make sure it doesn't smell bad. They are also asked to squeeze the dung to make sure it is not too watery. To check for teeth problems, visitors check to see if the dung is finely ground. If for example whole leaves are found in the dung, then the elephant's teeth are not working properly. Elephants have 6 sets of teeth in their lifetime, and lose their last set of teeth near the end of their life. If their food is not being properly chewed, this means they are old and nearing the end of their life. To checked sweat gland health, visitors touch near the base of their elephant's toenails to check for sweat. To check for sleeping problems, visitors check to see if their elephant has dirt on its sides. This is because elephants, who sleep for only around four hours a night, sleep on their sides while sleeping deeply. If they do not have dirt marks on their sides, then they slept standing up. Elephants who sleep standing up are generally sick. After the elephants' health has been checked, visitors are given a branch with leaves to sweep the dirt off their elephant's backs. To do this, visitors are told to gently pull on their elephant's ear to get them to sit down. The next stage in cleaning their elephant is when visitors and their elephants are led to a nearby waterfall bathing area. This is where the visitors begin to brush and bathe their elephant. To bathe their elephant, they toss water from the bathing area onto them with buckets. Visitors brush their elephant with hard-bristled brushes to get the dirt off of them. Bathing them is important, since when riding them dirt could get pushed into their skin and cause it to get infected.

Elephant ride

The day concludes with a barebacked elephant ride to nearby temples, waterfalls, or forests. To get up onto the elephants, visitors are given three options. First, to use their elephant's bent leg to climb up onto its back. Second, to sit or stand on their elephant's trunk, which lifts them onto its back. And lastly, to have their elephant sit down and climb onto its back. To ride their elephant, visitors are told to sit on their neck and to put their feet and knees behind their elephant's ears. To hang on, visitors put their hands on the top of their elephant's head.

Importance

Theerapat stresses that the reason Patara is important is to regrow the rapidly decreasing elephant population. The population is decreasing due to environmental threats and the elephant trade. In the 1800s, back when Thailand was Siam, it still contained around 100,000 elephants. Since then, the number has been declining. Over just the last 40 years, the population has decreased from around 6,000 to around 3,200. In terms of elephants in the wild, an official count has not been taken since 1991, and that count said there is only approximately 1,000–2,000 wild elephants. This is why Theerapat is hesitant for Patara be a farm that only releases elephants, instead of also breeding them. His reasoning is that, “their survival rates are too low. Plus there’s not enough forestland and food yet. And poachers kill them for ivory or steal their babies to put into a circus or zoo."

Environmental issues and the elephant tourism industry

The major environmental issue that affects elephants is deforestation. Although Thailand has restored 10% of its forest and will restore 20% in the next 15 years, it is not enough for many elephants to live in. Another aspect of deforestation that affected elephants in the past is the teak trade. This is because elephants were used for labor in the destruction of these forests. Nowadays, using them for this kind of labor is not a major concern since teak logging was banned in Thailand in 1989. Even with this ban, some illegal logging activities still happen along the Thai-Burma border. Immediately after the 1989 ban, many laborer elephants were unemployed. This happened when the tourist industry in Thailand was becoming big, and therefore many of these elephants were bought to be used in the elephant tourism industry.

Street elephants

Since after the 1989 logging ban many mahouts were also left without jobs, many also contribute their elephants to the tourism industry by using them to beg in the cities. These "street elephants" are used to give tourists rides, and right now there are around 100 elephants in Bangkok being used to beg. This results in a minimum of 15 elephants being injured in traffic accidents per month. Since many of these elephants are separated from their mothers too young, their skin is not tough enough to protect them from the sun, their feet are not developed enough to work all day, and they do not have access to their mother's milk and are therefore malnourished. Furthermore, since they are exposed to gas from traffic for around 12 hours a day, they develop damage to their respiratory systems. The noise from this traffic can also damage their hearing.

Elephant trade

Much of the elephant trade is the result of tourism, and many other elephant farms get their elephants illegally by buying them from people who poach them from the wild. Many of these elephants are captured in Myanmar, and are easily sold in Thailand on the Thai-Burma border. To capture them, they are herded into pit traps, whereas older elephants are often shot and younger elephants are captured and then sold. This is because tourists prefer to see younger elephants, which has made the current price for young elephants around $33,000. As of 2015, it is estimated that every week, one baby elephant is smuggled into Thailand to become part of the elephant tourist industry. Once they are captured, they are beaten in order to be domesticated. This practice must be done before they can be ridden, and is called Phajeen, or "the crush". This practice is allowed to take place since elephants don't need to be registered by the Thai government until they are eight years old. It is also easy to say an elephant was born in captivity and to fake their documentation about their birth and ownership. Even when they are registered, the laws that the Thai government has put in place to protect elephants are not always enforced. For example, although in 2012 the Thai government tried to stop the trade of elephants from Myanmar, between 2011–2013 it is estimated that up to 81% of elephants in the Thai tourism industry were illegally captured. At some elephant farms where these elephants are sold, elephants are controlled and made to do certain tricks by using metal bull-hooks and nails. These tricks include painting, dancing, and walking on two legs.

See also
Asian elephant
Mahout
Wildlife conservation
Deforestation
Illegal logging
Poaching
Chiang Mai, Thailand
Tourism in Thailand
Ecotourism

References

External links
Patara Elephant Farm website
Patara Elephant Farm Facebook page

2001 establishments in Thailand
Elephant conservation organizations
Organizations established in 2001
Tourist attractions in Chiang Mai province
Wildlife conservation in Thailand
Elephants in Thailand
Elephant sanctuaries